Ivan Marushchak (born 25 April 1970) is a Ukrainian football coach.

Career
In 1988–90, he served in the Soviet Army, after which worked as a sports instructor in Chernivtsi. In 2003 while working in SC Tavriya Simferopol, Marushchak graduated the Moscow State Academy of Physical Culture and Sports.

In 2014, Marushchak ended up in a middle of political scandal connected with the 2014 Crimea crisis when FC Zhemchuzhyna Yalta played couple of exhibition games with Russian FC Terek Grozny. After the Crimean crisis Marushchak coached Zhemchuzhyna Yalta which competed in the 2014 Republican championship leading it at the first half.

In August 2014 Zhemchuzhyna Yalta coached by Marushchak started to play in the Russian Cup and the Russian Second League.

Marushchak is a non-partisan member of Ternopil Oblast Council. In 2015, he was a president of FC Ahro Synkiv and in 2016 – president of FC Ternopil.

References

External links
 Marushchak profile at the Ternopil Oblast Council
 Marushchak profile at footballfacts.ru

1970 births
Living people
People from Ternopil Oblast
Ukrainian football managers
Ukrainian expatriate football managers
Expatriate football managers in Russia
Ukrainian expatriate sportspeople in Russia
FC Yalos Yalta managers
SC Olkom Melitopol managers
FC Knyazha-2 Shchaslyve managers
FC Feniks-Illichovets Kalinine managers
FC Zhemchuzhyna Yalta managers
FC Ternopil managers
Local politicians in Ukraine